Material nonimplication or abjunction (Latin ab = "from", junctio =–"joining") is the negation of material implication.

Definition

Truth table

Logical Equivalences

Material nonimplication may be defined as the negation of material implication.

Properties

falsehood-preserving: The interpretation under which all variables are assigned a truth value of "false" produces a truth value of "false" as a result of material nonimplication.

Symbol
The symbol for material nonimplication is simply a crossed-out material implication symbol. Its Unicode symbol is 219B16 (8603 decimal): ↛.

Natural language

Grammatical
"p minus q."

"p without q."

Rhetorical
"p but not q."

Computer science
Bitwise operation: A&(~B) 

Logical operation: A&&(!B)

See also
 Implication
 Boolean algebra
 Set difference

References

External links

Logical connectives